Talem Seh Shanbeh (also Romanized as Tālem Seh Shanbeh; also known as Seh Shanbeh, Sishambeh, and Sishkhambekh) is a village in Eslamabad Rural District, Sangar District, Rasht County, Gilan Province, Iran. At the 2006 census, its population was 3,007, in 880 families.

References 

Populated places in Rasht County